Homeschooling or home schooling, also known as home education or elective home education (EHE), is the education of school-aged children at home or a variety of places other than a school. Usually conducted by a parent, tutor, or an online teacher, many homeschool families use less formal, more personalized and individualized methods of learning that are not always found in schools. The actual practice of homeschooling can vary. The spectrum ranges from highly structured forms based on traditional school lessons to more open, free forms such as unschooling, which is a lesson- and curriculum-free implementation of homeschooling. Some families who initially attended a school go through a deschool phase to break away from school habits and prepare for homeschooling. While "homeschooling" is the term commonly used in North America, "home education" is primarily used in Europe and many Commonwealth countries. Homeschooling should not be confused with distance education, which generally refers to the arrangement where the student is educated by and conforms to the requirements of an online school, rather than being educated independently and unrestrictedly by their parents or by themselves.

Before the introduction of compulsory school attendance laws, most childhood education was done by families and local communities. By the early 19th century, attending a school became the most common means of education in the developed world. In the mid to late 20th century, more people began questioning the efficiency and sustainability of school learning, which again led to an increase in the number of homeschoolers, especially in the Americas and some European countries. Today, homeschooling is a relatively widespread form of education and a legal alternative to public and private schools in many countries, which many people believe is due to the rise of the Internet, which enables people to obtain information very quickly. There are also nations in which homeschooling is regulated or illegal, as recorded in the article Homeschooling international status and statistics. During the COVID-19 pandemic, many students from all over the world had to study from home due to the danger posed by the virus. However, this was mostly implemented in the form of distance education rather than traditional homeschooling.

There are many different reasons for homeschooling, ranging from personal interests to dissatisfaction with the public school system. Some parents see better educational opportunities for their child in homeschooling, for example because they know their child more accurately than a teacher and can concentrate fully on educating usually one to a few persons and therefore can respond more precisely to their individual strengths and weaknesses, or because they think that they can better prepare their children for the life outside of school. Some children can also learn better at home, for example, because they are not held back, disturbed or distracted from school matters, do not feel underchallenged or overwhelmed with certain topics, find that certain temperaments are encouraged in school, while others are inhibited, do not cope well with the often predetermined structure or are bullied there. Homeschooling is also an option for families living in remote rural areas, those temporarily abroad and those who travel frequently and therefore face the physical impossibility or difficulty of getting their children into school and families who want to spend more and better time with their children. Health reasons and special needs can also play a role in why children cannot attend a school regularly and are at least partially homeschooled.

Critics of homeschooling argue that children may lack adequate socialization and therefore have poorer social skills. Some are also concerned that parents may be unqualified to guide and advise their children in life skills. Critics also say that a child might not encounter people of other cultures, worldviews, and socioeconomic groups if they are not enrolled in a school. Therefore, these critics believe that homeschooling cannot guarantee a comprehensive and neutral education if educational standards are not prescribed. Homeschooled children sometimes score higher on standardized tests and their parents reported via survey that their children have equally or better developed social skills and participate more in cultural and family activities on average than public school students. In addition, studies suggest that homeschoolers are generally more likely to have higher self-esteem, deeper friendships, and better relationships with adults, and are less susceptible to peer pressure.

Terminology 
While "homeschooling" is the term commonly used in the United States and other nations in North America, "home education" is primarily used in the United Kingdom, elsewhere in Europe and many Commonwealth countries. Some believe that homeschooling has become more attractive and popular than ever before since the days of quick information retrieval on the Internet.

History

Early history 
For most of history and in different cultures, homeschooling was a common practice by family members and local communities. Enlisting professional tutors was an option available only to the wealthy. Homeschooling declined in the 19th and 20th centuries with the enactment of compulsory school attendance laws. However, it continued to be practised in isolated communities. Homeschooling began a resurgence in the 1960s and 1970s with educational reformists dissatisfied with industrialized education.

Public schools 
The earliest public schools in modern Western culture were established during the Reformation with the encouragement of Martin Luther in the German states of Gotha and Thuringia in 1524 and 1527. From the 1500s to 1800s the literacy rate increased until a majority of adults were literate, but development of the literacy rate occurred before the implementation of compulsory attendance and universal education.

Home education and apprenticeship continued to remain the main form of education until the 1830s. However, in the 18th century, the majority of people in Europe lacked formal education. Since the early 19th century, formal classroom schooling became the most common means of schooling throughout the developed countries.

Colonial North America 
In 1647, New England provided compulsory elementary education. Regional differences in schooling existed in colonial America. In the south, farms and plantations were so widely dispersed that community schools such as those in the more compact settlements of the north were impossible. In the middle colonies, the educational situation varied when comparing New York with New England.

Most Native American tribal cultures traditionally used homeschooling and apprenticeship to pass knowledge to children. Parents were supported by extended relatives and tribal leaders in the education of their children. The Native Americans vigorously resisted compulsory education in the United States.

United States in 1960s 
In the 1960s, Rousas John Rushdoony began to advocate homeschooling, which he saw as a way to combat the secular nature of the public school system in the United States. He vigorously attacked progressive school reformers such as Horace Mann and John Dewey, and argued for the dismantling of the state's influence in education in three works: Intellectual Schizophrenia, The Messianic Character of American Education, and The Philosophy of the Christian Curriculum. Rushdoony was frequently called as an expert witness by the Home School Legal Defense Association (HSLDA) in court cases. He frequently advocated the use of private schools.

Raymond and Dorothy Moore 
During this time, American educational professionals Raymond and Dorothy Moore began to research the academic validity of the rapidly growing Early Childhood Education movement. This research included independent studies by other researchers and a review of over 8,000 studies bearing on early childhood education and the physical and mental development of children.

They asserted that formal schooling before ages 8–12 not only lacked the anticipated effectiveness but also harmed children. The Moores published their view that formal schooling was damaging young children academically, socially, mentally, and even physiologically. The Moores presented evidence that childhood problems such as juvenile delinquency, nearsightedness, increased enrollment of students in special education classes and behavioral problems were the results of increasingly earlier enrollment of students. The Moores cited studies demonstrating that orphans who were given surrogate mothers were measurably more intelligent, with superior long-term effects – even though the mothers were "mentally retarded teenagers" – and that illiterate tribal mothers in Africa produced children who were socially and emotionally more advanced than typical western children, "by western standards of measurement".

Their primary assertion was that the bonds and emotional development made at home with parents during these years produced critical long-term results that were cut short by enrollment in schools, and could neither be replaced nor corrected in an institutional setting afterwards. Recognizing a necessity for early out-of-home care for some children, particularly special needs and impoverished children and children from exceptionally inferior homes, they maintained that the vast majority of children were far better situated at home, even with mediocre parents, than with the most gifted and motivated teachers in a school setting. They described the difference as follows: "This is like saying, if you can help a child by taking him off the cold street and housing him in a warm tent, then warm tents should be provided for all children – when obviously most children already have even more secure housing."

The Moores embraced homeschooling after the publication of their first work, Better Late Than Early, in 1975, and became important homeschool advocates and consultants with the publication of books such as Home Grown Kids (1981), and Homeschool Burnout.

Simultaneously, other authors published books questioning the premises and efficacy of compulsory schooling, including Deschooling Society by Ivan Illich in 1970 and No More Public School by Harold Bennet in 1972.

John Holt 
In 1976, educator John Holt published Instead of Education: Ways to Help People Do Things Better. In its conclusion, he called for a "Children's Underground Railroad" to help children escape compulsory schooling. In response, Holt was contacted by families from around the U.S. to tell him that they were educating their children at home. In 1977, after corresponding with a number of these families, Holt began producing the magazine Growing Without Schooling (GSW), a newsletter dedicated to home education. Holt was nicknamed the "father of homeschooling." Holt later wrote a book about homeschooling, Teach Your Own, in 1981.

In 1980, Holt said,

I want to make it clear that I don't see homeschooling as some kind of answer to badness of schools. I think that the home is the proper base for the exploration of the world which we call learning or education. The home would be the best base no matter how good the schools were.

One common theme in the homeschool philosophies of both Holt and that of the Moores is that home education should not attempt to bring the school to construct into the home, or a view of education as an academic preliminary to life. They viewed home education as a natural, experiential aspect of life that occurs as the members of the family are involved with one another in daily living.

Homeschooling can be used as a form of supplemental education and as a way of helping children learn under specific circumstances. The term may also refer to instruction in the home under the supervision of correspondence schools or umbrella schools. Some jurisdictions require adherence to an approved curriculum.

United States in 1970s 
In the 1970s, a modern homeschooling movement began when American educator and author John Holt questioned the efficiency of schools and the sustainability of school learning, arguing that schools focus on strictly doing "skill drill" instead of other methods of learning. The influence of Raymond Moore is sometimes also held responsible for this movement on the religious right. A curriculum-free philosophy of homeschooling called "unschooling" also emerged around this time, although it would take a few more decades for this form of education to become popular. The term was coined in 1977 by Holt's GWS. The term emphasizes the more spontaneous, less structured learning environment in which a child's interests drive his pursuit of knowledge. Some parents provide a liberal arts education using the trivium and quadrivium as the main models.

COVID-19 pandemic 
The COVID-19 pandemic led to school closures around the world, which is why over 300 million students had to study from home. Since the material to be learned was mainly outsourced to home and specified and checked by virtual schools, it can be said that this was mostly implemented in the form of distance education rather than traditional homeschooling in which parents educate their child independent from school. Because the transition to homeschooling often happened overnight without any possibilities of preparation for parents, teachers and children, this caused economic, educational, political and psychological distress.

Motivations

There are a multitude of sometimes complex reasons why parents and children choose to homeschool, some of which overlap with those for unschooling and may be very different depending on the country and (current) situation of parents and children.

Parents commonly cite two main motivations for homeschooling their children: dissatisfaction with the local schools and the interest in increased involvement with their children's learning and development. Parental dissatisfaction with available schools typically includes concerns about the school environment, the quality of academic instruction, the curriculum, bullying, racism and lack of faith in the school's ability to cater to their children's special needs. Some parents homeschool in order to have greater control over what and how their children are taught, to cater more adequately to an individual child's aptitudes and abilities, to provide instruction from a specific religious or and moral position, and to take advantage of the efficiency of one-to-one instruction and thus allow the child to spend more time on childhood activities, socializing, and non-academic learning.

Some African-American families choose to homeschool as a way of increasing their children's understanding of African-American history – such as the Jim Crow laws that resulted in African Americans being prevented from reading and writing – and to limit the harm caused by the unintentional and sometimes subtle systemic racism that affects most American schools.

Some parents have objections to the secular nature of public schools and homeschool in order to give their children a religious education. Use of a religious curriculum is common among these families.

Some parents are of the opinion that certain temperaments are promoted in school, while others are inhibited which may also be a reason to homeschool their children.

Another argument for homeschooling children may be the protection against physical and emotional violence, bullying, exclusion, drugs, stress, sexualization, social pressures, excessive performance thoughts, socialization groups or role models with negative impact and degrading treatment in school.

Some children may also prefer to or can learn more efficiently at home, for example, because they are not distracted or slowed down by school matters and can, for example, spend several hours dealing with the same topic undisturbed. There are studies that show that homeschooled children are more likely to graduate and perform better at university.

Homeschooling may also be a factor in the choice of parenting style. Homeschooling can be a matter of consistency for families living in isolated rural locations, for those temporarily abroad, and for those who travel frequently. Many young athletes, actors, and musicians are taught at home to accommodate their training and practice schedules more conveniently. Homeschooling can be about mentorship and apprenticeship, in which a tutor or teacher is with the child for many years and becomes more intimately acquainted with the child. Many parents also homeschool their children and return their child into the school system later on, for example because they think that their child is too young or not yet ready to start school.

Some children also have health issues and therefore cannot attend a school regularly and are at least partially homeschooled or take distance education instead.

Another commonly cited reason for choosing homeschooling is the flexibility and freedom which parents and children have.

COVID-19 has reinforced some parent's minds about homeschooling. The fact that parents realized remote learning was possible thanks to new technologies means that they have additional options to consider should their child face problems of any kind at school.

Teaching methods, forms and philosophies
Homeschooling is usually conducted by a parent, tutor, or an online teacher, but the concrete practice can be very different. The spectrum ranges from highly structured forms based on traditional school lessons to more open, free forms like unschooling, which is a curriculum-free implementation of homeschooling that involves teaching children based on their interests.

Many homeschool families use a wide variety of methods and materials and less formal educational methods, which represent a variety of educational philosophies and paradigms. Some of the methods or learning environments used include classical education (including Trivium, Quadrivium), Charlotte Mason education, Montessori method, theory of multiple intelligences, unschooling, Waldorf education, school-at-home (curriculum choices from both secular and religious publishers), A Thomas Jefferson Education, unit studies, curriculum made up from private or small publishers, apprenticeship, hands-on-learning, distance learning (both online and correspondence), dual enrollment in local schools or colleges, and curriculum provided by local schools and many others. Some of these approaches are used in private and public schools. Educational research and studies support the use of some of these methods. Unschooling, natural learning, Charlotte Mason Education, Montessori, Waldorf, apprenticeship, hands-on-learning, unit studies are supported to varying degrees by research by constructivist learning theories and situated cognition theories. Elements of these theories may be found in the other methods as well.

A student's education may be customized to support his or her learning level, style, and interests. It is not uncommon for a student to experience more than one approach as the family discovers what works best for their student. Many families use an eclectic approach, picking and choosing from various suppliers. For sources of curricula and books, a study found that 78 percent utilized "a public library"; 77 percent used "a homeschooling catalogue, publisher, or individual specialist"; 68 percent used "retail bookstore or another store"; 60 percent used "an education publisher that was not affiliated with homeschooling." "Approximately half" used curriculum from "a homeschooling organization", 37 percent from a "church, synagogue or other religious institution" and 23 percent from "their local public school or district." In 2003, 41 percent utilized some sort of distance learning, approximately 20 percent by "television, video or radio"; 19 percent via "The Internet, e-mail, or the World Wide Web"; and 15 percent taking a "correspondence course by mail designed specifically for homeschoolers."

Individual governmental units, e.g. states and local districts, vary in official curriculum and attendance requirements.

Informal learning 

As a subset of homeschooling, informal learning happens outside of the classroom but has no traditional boundaries of education. Informal learning is an everyday form of learning through participation and creation, in contrast with the traditional view of teacher-centered learning. The term is often combined with non-formal learning and self-directed learning. Informal learning differs from traditional learning since there are no expected objectives or outcomes. From the learner's standpoint, the knowledge that they receive is not intentional. Topics such as planting a garden, baking a cake or even talking to a technician at work about the installation of new software can be considered informal learning. The individual is completing a task with different intentions but ends up learning skills in the process. Children watching their tomato plants grow will not generate questions about photosynthesis but they will learn that their plants are growing with water and sunlight. This leads them to have a base understanding of complex scientific concepts without any background studying. The recent trend of homeschooling becoming less stigmatized has been in connection with the traditional waning of the idea that the state needs to be in primary and ultimate control over the education and upbringing of all children to create future adult citizens. This breeds an ever-growing importance on the ideas and concepts that children learn outside of the traditional classroom setting, including informal learning.

Depending on the part of the world, informal learning can take on many different identities and has differing cultural importances. Many ways of organizing homeschooling draw on apprenticeship qualities and on non-western cultures. In some South American indigenous cultures, such as the Chillihuani community in Peru, children learn irrigation and farming technique through play, advancing them not only in their own village and society but also in their knowledge of realistic techniques that they will need to survive. In Western culture, children use informal learning in two main ways. The first as talked about is through hands-on experience with new material. The second is asking questions to someone who has more experience than they have (i.e. parents, elders). Children's inquisitive nature is their way of cementing the ideas they have learned through exposure to informal learning. It is a more casual way of learning than traditional learning and serves the purpose of taking in information any which way they can.

Structured versus unstructured 
All other approaches to homeschooling are subsumed under two basic categories: structured and unstructured homeschooling. Structured homeschooling includes any method or style of home education that follows a basic curriculum with articulated goals and outcomes. This style attempts to imitate the structure of the traditional school setting while personalizing the curriculum. Unstructured homeschooling is any form of home education where parents do not construct a curriculum at all. Unschooling, as it is known, attempts to teach through the child's daily experiences and focuses more on self-directed learning by the child, free of textbooks, teachers, and any formal assessment of success or failure.

Unit studies
In a unit study approach, multiple subjects such as math, science, history, art, and geography, are studied in relation to a single topic. Unit studies are useful for teaching multiple grades simultaneously as the difficulty level can be adjusted for each student. An extended form of unit studies, Integrated Thematic Instruction utilizes one central theme integrated throughout the curriculum so that students finish a school year with a deep understanding of a certain broad subject or idea.

All-in-one curricula
All-in-one homeschooling curricula (variously known as school-at-home, the traditional approach, or school-in-a-box) are instructional methods of teaching in which the curriculum and homework of the student are similar or identical to those used in a public or private school. Purchased as a grade-level package or separately by subject, the package may contain all of the needed books, materials, tests, answer keys, and extensive teacher guides. These materials cover the same subject areas as public schools, allowing for an easy transition into the school system. These are among the most expensive options for homeschooling, but they require minimal preparation and are easy to use. Some localities provide the same materials used at local schools to homeschoolers. The purchase of a complete curriculum and their teaching/grading service from an accredited distance learning curriculum provider may allow students to obtain an accredited high school diploma.

Unschooling and natural learning

Natural learning refers to a type of learning-on-demand where children pursue knowledge based on their interests and parents take an active part in facilitating activities and experiences conducive to learning but do not rely heavily on textbooks or spend much time "teaching", looking instead for "learning moments" throughout their daily activities. Parents see their role as that of affirming through positive feedback and modeling the necessary skills, and the child's role as being responsible for asking and learning.

The term unschooling as coined by John Holt describes an approach in which parents do not authoritatively direct the child's education, but interact with the child following the child's own interests, leaving them free to explore and learn as their interests lead. "Unschooling" does not indicate that the child is not being educated, but that the child is not being "schooled", or educated in a rigid school-type manner. Holt asserted that children learn through the experiences of life, and he encouraged parents to live their lives with their child. Also known as interest-led or child-led learning, unschooling attempts to follow opportunities as they arise in real life. Children at school learn from 1 teacher and 2 auxiliary teachers in a classroom of approximately 30. Kids have the opportunity of dedicated education at home with a ratio of 1 to 1. An unschooled child may utilize texts or classroom instruction, but these are not considered central to education. Holt asserted that there is no specific body of knowledge that is, or should be, required of a child.

Both unschooling and natural learning advocates believe that children learn best by doing; a child may learn reading to further an interest about history or other cultures, or math skills by operating a small business or sharing in family finances. They may learn animal husbandry keeping dairy goats or meat rabbits, botany tending a kitchen garden, chemistry to understand the operation of firearms or the internal combustion engine, or politics and local history by following a zoning or historical-status dispute. While any type of homeschoolers may also use these methods, the unschooled child initiates these learning activities. The natural learner participates with parents and others in learning together.

Another prominent proponent of unschooling is John Taylor Gatto, author of Dumbing Us Down, The Exhausted School, A Different Kind of Teacher, and Weapons of Mass Instruction. Gatto argues that public education is the primary tool of "state-controlled consciousness" and serves as a prime illustration of the total institution — a social system which impels obedience to the state and quells free-thinking or dissent.

Autonomous learning
Autonomous learning is a school of education which sees learners as individuals who can and should be autonomous; i.e., be responsible for their own learning climate.

Autonomous education helps students develop their self-consciousness, vision, practicality, and freedom of discussion. These attributes serve to aid the student in his/her independent learning. However, a student must not start their autonomous learning completely on their own. It is said that first having interaction with someone who has more knowledge in a subject will speed up the student's learning and allow them to learn more independently.

Some degree of autonomous learning is popular with those who home educate their children. In true autonomous learning, the child usually gets to decide what projects they wish to tackle or what interests to pursue. In-home education, this can be instead of or in addition to regular subjects like doing math or English.

According to Home Education UK, the autonomous education philosophy emerged from the epistemology of Karl Popper in The Myth of the Framework: In Defence of Science and Rationality, which is developed in the debates, which seek to rebut the neo-Marxist social philosophy of convergence proposed by the Frankfurt School  (e.g. Theodor W. Adorno, Jürgen Habermas, Max Horkheimer).

Hybrid homeschooling 
Hybrid homeschooling or flex-school is a form of homeschooling in which children split their time between homeschool and a more traditional schooling environment like a school. The number of students who participated in hybrid homeschooling increased during the COVID-19 pandemic.

A commonly cited reason for choosing this model is that parents are not sure whether they can provide their children a comprehensive and neutral education at home or cannot devote themselves to homeschooling full-time due to time constraints or excessive stress. Some families also want their children to socialize with other children and find that schools are better suited for this purpose because social exchange does not only take place occasionally, but is an everyday experience there.

Homeschool cooperatives

A homeschool cooperative is a cooperative of families who homeschool their children. It provides an opportunity for children to learn from other parents who are more specialized in certain areas or subjects. Co-ops also provide social interaction. They may take lessons together or go on field trips. Some co-ops also offer events such as prom and graduation for homeschoolers.

Homeschoolers are beginning to utilize Web 2.0 as a way to simulate homeschool cooperatives online. With social networks, homeschoolers can chat, discuss threads in forums, share information and tips, and even participate in online classes via blackboard systems similar to those used by colleges.

Research

Test results
According to the Home School Legal Defense Association (HSLDA) in 2004, "Many studies over the last few years have established the academic excellence of homeschooled children." Home Schooling Achievement, a compilation of studies published by the HSLDA, supported the academic integrity of homeschooling. This booklet summarized a 1997 study by Ray and the 1999 Rudner study. The Rudner study noted two limitations of its own research: it is not necessarily representative of all homeschoolers and it is not a comparison with other schooling methods. Among the homeschooled students who took the tests, the average homeschooled student outperformed his public school peers by 30 to 37 percentile points across all subjects. The study also indicates that public school performance gaps between minorities and genders were virtually non-existent among the homeschooled students who took the tests.

A survey of 11,739 homeschooled students conducted in 2008 found that, on average, the homeschooled students scored 37 percentile points above public school students on standardized achievement tests. This is consistent with the 1999 Rudner study. However, Rudner said that these same students in public school may have scored just as well because of the dedicated parents they had. The Ray study also found that homeschooled students who had a certified teacher as a parent scored one percentile lower than homeschooled students who did not have a certified teacher as a parent. Studies have shown homeschooled students score higher on standardized tests than traditionally schooled youth Another nationwide descriptive study conducted by Ray contained students ranging from ages 5–18 and he found that homeschoolers scored in at least the 80th percentile on their tests.

In 2011, a quasi-experimental study was conducted that included homeschooled and traditional public students between the ages of 5 and 10. It was discovered that the majority of the homeschooled children achieved higher standardized scores compared to their counterparts. However, Martin-Chang also found that unschooling children ages 5–10 scored significantly below traditionally educated children, while academically oriented homeschooled children scored from one half grade level above to 4.5 grade levels above traditionally schooled children on standardized tests (n=37 homeschooled children matched with children from the same socioeconomic and educational background).

Studies have also examined the impact of homeschooling on students' GPAs. Cogan (2010) found that homeschooled students had higher high school GPAs (3.74) and transfer GPAs (3.65) than conventional students. Snyder (2013) provided corroborating evidence that homeschoolers were outperforming their peers in the areas of standardized tests and overall GPAs. Looking beyond high school, a study by the 1990 National Home Education Research Institute (as cited by Wichers, 2001) found that at least 33% of homeschooled students attended a four-year college, and 17% attended a two-year college.  This same study examined the students after one year, finding that 17% pursued higher education.

On average, studies suggest homeschoolers score at or above the national average on standardized tests. Homeschool students have been accepted into many Ivy League universities. However, The Coalition for Responsible Homeschooling notes that "Our knowledge of homeschooling’s effect on academic achievement is limited by the fact that many of the studies that have been conducted on homeschoolers suffer from methodological problems which make their findings inconclusive."

Outcomes

Homeschooled children may receive more individualized attention than students enrolled in traditional public schools. A 2011 study suggests that a structured environment could play a key role in homeschooler academic achievement. This means that parents were highly involved in their child's education and they were creating clear educational goals. In addition, these students were being offered organized lesson plans which are either self-made or purchased.

Homeschooled youth are less likely to use and abuse illicit substances and are more likely to disapprove of using alcohol and marijuana. There are also studies according to which homeschooled children are less likely to be sexually abused than children in public schools.

In the 1970s, Raymond and Dorothy Moore conducted four federally funded analyses of more than 8,000 early childhood studies, from which they published their original findings in Better Late Than Early, 1975. This was followed by School Can Wait, a repackaging of these same findings designed specifically for educational professionals. They concluded that "where possible, children should be withheld from formal schooling until at least ages eight to ten." Their reason was that children "are not mature enough for formal school programs until their senses, coordination, neurological development and cognition are ready". They concluded that the outcome of forcing children into formal schooling is a sequence of "1) uncertainty as the child leaves the family nest early for a less secure environment, 2) puzzlement at the new pressures and restrictions of the classroom, 3) frustration because unready learning tools – senses, cognition, brain hemispheres, coordination – cannot handle the regimentation of formal lessons and the pressures they bring, 4) hyperactivity growing out of nerves and jitter, from frustration, 5)  failure which quite naturally flows from the four experiences above, and 6) delinquency which is failure's twin and apparently for the same reason." According to the Moores, "early formal schooling is burning out our children. Teachers who attempt to cope with these youngsters also are burning out." Aside from academic performance, they think early formal schooling also destroys "positive sociability", encourages peer dependence, and discourages self-worth, optimism, respect for parents, and trust in peers. They believe this situation is particularly acute for boys because of their delay in maturity. The Moores cited a Smithsonian Report on the development of genius, indicating a requirement for "1) much time spent with warm, responsive parents and other adults, 2) very little time spent with peers, and 3) a great deal of free exploration under parental guidance." Their analysis suggested that children need "more of home and less of formal school", "more free exploration with... parents, and fewer limits of classroom and books", and "more old fashioned chores – children working with parents – and less attention to rivalry sports and amusements."

A study conducted by Ray in 2010 indicates that the higher the level of parents' income, the more likely the homeschooled child is able to achieve academic success.

Higher education admittance procedures were altered due to Covid-19 for the traditionally schooled student.

The ACT and SAT became test optional, yet the homeschooled applicant is required to submit college entrance exams.

Some homeschoolers averaged higher scores on these college entrance tests in South Carolina. Other scores (1999 data) showed mixed results, for example showing higher levels for homeschoolers in English (homeschooled 23.4 vs national average 20.5) and reading (homeschooled 24.4 vs national average 21.4) on the ACT, but mixed scores in math (homeschooled 20.4 vs national average 20.7 on the ACT as opposed homeschooled 535 vs national average 511 on the 1999 SAT math).

Some advocates of homeschooling and educational choice counter with an input-output theory, pointing out that home educators expend only an average of $500–600 a year on each student (not counting the cost of the parents' time), in comparison to $9,000–10,000 (including the cost of staff time) for each public school student in the United States, which suggests home-educated students would be especially dominant on tests if afforded access to an equal commitment of tax-funded educational resources.

Many teachers and school districts oppose the idea of homeschooling. However, research has shown that homeschooled children often excel in many areas of academic endeavour. According to a study done on the homeschool movement, homeschoolers often achieve academic success and admission into elite universities. According to the National Home Education Research Institute president, Brian Ray, socialization is not a problem for homeschooling children, many of whom are involved in community sports, volunteer activities, book groups, or homeschool co-ops.

In the UK, the government has noted that no figures are available on educational attainment for children educated at home: "This means no assessment can be made of the impact on educational attainment of being home schooled". There is some evidence from 2009 that home-educated children in the UK are more likely to be NEET, Not in Employment, Education or Training, at age 16 to 18.

Socialization

Using the Piers-Harris Children's Self-Concept Scale, John Taylor later found that, "while half of the conventionally schooled children scored at or below the 50th percentile (in self-concept), only 10.3% of the home-schooling children did so." He further stated that "the self-concept of home-schooling children is significantly higher statistically than that of children attending conventional school. This has implications in the areas of academic achievement and socialization which have been found to parallel self-concept. Regarding socialization, Taylor's results would mean that very few home-schooling children are socially deprived. He states that critics who speak out against homeschooling on the basis of social deprivation are actually addressing an area which favours homeschoolers.

In 2003, the National Home Education Research Institute conducted a survey of 7,300 U.S. adults who had been homeschooled (5,000 for more than seven years). Their findings included:

Homeschool graduates are active and involved in their communities. 71% participate in an ongoing community service activity, like coaching a sports team, volunteering at a school, or working with a church or neighborhood association, compared with 37% of U.S. adults of similar ages from a traditional education background.
Homeschool graduates are more involved in civic affairs and vote in much higher percentages than their peers. 76% of those surveyed between the ages of 18 and 24 voted within the last five years, compared with only 29% of the corresponding U.S. populace. The numbers are even greater in older age groups, with voting levels not falling below 95%, compared with a high of 53% for the corresponding U.S. populace.
58.9% report that they are "very happy" with life, compared with 27.6% for the general U.S. population. 73.2% find life "exciting", compared with 47.3%

Richard G. Medlin, Ph.D.'s research found that homeschooled children have better social skills than children attending traditional schools.

Legality and prevalence

Criticism

Resistance to homeschooling comes from some organizations of teachers and school districts. The National Education Association, a United States teachers' union and professional association, has asserted that teachers should be licensed and that state-approved curricula should be used.

Critics argue that homeschooled children can be indoctrinated if educational standards are not prescribed and if there is no regular monitoring by controlling authorities. There is also concern that homeschooling reduces a child's exposure to mandated reporters such as teachers, making children more susceptible to sustained, unreported abuse. The vast majority of homeschoolers are doing so for religious reasons. They are primarily concerned with producing "virtuous" adults, rather than "educated" adults. While there is not enough data to determine exact rates of abuse in homeschooling, but there is strong evidence to suggest that parents who engage in maltreatment and educational neglect are more likely to use homeschooling as a guise.

Elizabeth Bartholet, a Harvard professor of law and faculty director of the Law School's Child Advocacy Program, recommended a ban on home education in 2019, calling it a risky practice.

Political scientist Rob Reich (not to be confused with the former Labor Secretary Robert Reich) speculated in The Civic Perils of Homeschooling (2002) that homeschooling could threaten to "insulate students from exposure to diverse ideas and people."

Gallup polls of American voters have shown a significant change in attitude in the last 20 years, from 73% opposed to homeschooling in 1985 to 54% opposed in 2001. In 1988, when asked whether parents should have a right to choose homeschooling, 53 percent thought that they should, as revealed by another poll.

See also

References

Further reading

External links

 A history of the modern homeschool movement, from the Cato Institute.
 National Home Education Research Institute (NHERI). NHERI produces research about homeschooling and sponsors the peer-reviewed academic journal Homeschool Researcher.
 "Homeschooling" in the Encyclopædia Britannica, written by Pat Farenga.